The 1984 San Diego State Aztecs football team represented San Diego State University during the 1984 NCAA Division I-A football season as a member of the Western Athletic Conference (WAC).

The team was led by head coach Doug Scovil, in his fourth year, and played home games at Jack Murphy Stadium in San Diego, California. They finished with a record of four wins, seven losses and one tie (4–7–1, 4–3–1 WAC).

Schedule

Team players in the NFL
The following were selected in the 1985 NFL Draft.

The following finished their college career in 1984, were not drafted, but played in the NFL.

Team awards

Notes

References

San Diego State
San Diego State Aztecs football seasons
San Diego State Aztecs football